The Institute for Food Laws & Regulations (IFLR) of the College of Agriculture and Natural Resources at Michigan State University. IFLR provides an Internet distance education program that consists of a series of region-specific food law courses taught completely over the Internet by an international network of food science academic and legal professionals who understand the legal complexities of the food laws and how they impact the flow of food and agricultural products across national boundaries.

The institute offers certificate programs in food law, one in International Food Law and one in United States Food Law. The coursework may also be applied to a master's degree in global food lawl from the Michigan State University College of Law or a master's degree in food safety from the Michigan State University College of Veterinary Medicine.

External links
Official website

Michigan State University